João Capistrano Honório de Abreu (1853 in Maranguape – 1927 in Rio de Janeiro) was a Brazilian historian. His works are characterized by a rigorous investigation of the sources and a critical view of the historical process. 
João Capistrano de Abreu was born in Maranguape, Ceará. He dedicated himself to the study of colonial Brazil. His book "Capítulos de História Colonial" ("Chapters of Colonial History") is a major reference for all who study Brazilian history.

Works
Estudo sobre Raimundo da Rocha Lima (1878);
José de Alencar (1878);
A língua dos Bacaeris (1897);
Capítulos de História Colonial (1907);
Dois documentos sobre Caxinauás (1911–1912);
Os Caminhos Antigos e o Povoamento do Brasil (1930);
O Descobrimento do Brasil (1883);
Ensaios e Estudos (1931–33, postmortem edition);
Correspondência (1954, postmortem edition).

References
Iglésias, Francisco. Historiadores do Brasil: capítulos de historiografia brasileira. Rio de Janeiro: Nova Fronteira; Belo Horizonte: UFMG, 2000. .

External links
Capistrano de Abreu's biography at University of São Paulo
Chapters of Colonial History, in Portuguese
 The discovery and settling of Brazil

1839 births
1908 deaths
Brazilian non-fiction writers